The Critics' Choice Television Award for Best Reality Series – Competition is one of the award categories presented annually by the Critics' Choice Television Awards (BTJA). It was introduced in 2011 when the event was first initiated. The winners are selected by a group of television critics that are part of the Broadcast Television Critics Association.

Winners and nominees

2010s

Multiple wins
5 wins
 The Voice (3 consecutive, 2 consecutive)

Multiple nominations
7 nominations
 The Voice
6 nominations

 The Amazing Race
4 nominations
 Chopped

3 nominations
 America's Got Talent
 Dancing with the Stars
 Face Off
 MasterChef Junior
 Project Runway
 RuPaul's Drag Race
 Shark Tank
 Survivor

2 nominations
 So You Think You Can Dance
 Top Chef

See also
Primetime Emmy Award for Outstanding Reality-Competition Program
 TCA Award for Outstanding Achievement in Reality Programming

References

Critics' Choice Television Awards